Repmånad is a Swedish comedy film which was released to cinemas in Sweden on 23 February 1979, directed by Lasse Åberg. The plot revolves around a group of men called in for refresher exercise (known as "repmånad" in Swedish, hence the title) in the Swedish Army, and who did their national service together some years earlier. The alternative name is "How to make boys out of men (Swedish:hur man gör pojkar av män), a joke on the military motto "We make men out of boys".

Cast 

 Janne 'Loffe' Carlsson as Oskar Löfgren
 Lasse Åberg as Helge Jonsson
 Ted Åström as Börje Larsson
 Lasse Haldenberg as Hans Öberg
 Weiron Holmberg as Tore Tallroth
 Lennart Skoogh as Jonas Gustafsson
 Ingvar Andersson as Captain 'Beethoven'
 Lena-Maria Gårdenäs-Lawton as Bea (as Lena-Maria)
 Agneta Prytz as Helge's mother
 Peter Ahlm as Major
 Lars Amble as Chief Editor
 Bengt Berger as Col. Berg
 Malou Berg as Doris' Friend
 Monica Dominique as Doris
 Charlie Elvegård as Göte

References

External links 

Swedish comedy films
1979 films
1970s Swedish-language films
Military humor in film
Films set in Sweden
Films shot in Sweden
1979 comedy films
Films directed by Lasse Åberg
Films set in Uppsala
1970s Swedish films